Eddie Manuel Rosario, Jr. (born September 28, 1991) is a Puerto Rican professional baseball left fielder for the Atlanta Braves of Major League Baseball (MLB). Rosario was selected by the Minnesota Twins in the fourth round of the 2010 MLB draft. He has previously played in MLB for the Twins and Cleveland Indians.

Rosario represented Puerto Rico in the 2013 and 2017 editions of the World Baseball Classic, winning a silver medal in both. After the 2013 season, Rosario received a 50-game suspension for using a banned substance, which he served at the start of the 2014 season. He made his major league debut in 2015, hitting a home run in his first at bat, on the first pitch, off of Scott Kazmir of the Oakland Athletics.

Early life
Eddie Rosario was born to parents Eddie Sr. and Maria on September 28, 1991. He was raised in Guayama, Puerto Rico.

Professional career
Rosario was scouted by Hector Otero, who worked for the Minnesota Twins at the time, as the organization's lead scout for South Florida and Puerto Rico. Rosario was subsequently selected by the Minnesota Twins in the fourth round of the 2010 MLB draft.

Minnesota Twins

Rosario first played in Minor League Baseball in 2010, in the Gulf Coast League. He advanced through the farm system of the Twins, first reaching Double-A in 2013 and Triple-A in 2015. He also played several seasons in the Puerto Rican Winter League, and played in the Arizona Fall League in 2013 and 2014.

Rosario made his major league debut on May 6, 2015. Leading off the bottom of the 3rd inning, Rosario swung at the first pitch he saw from Oakland Athletics starter Scott Kazmir, and hit an opposite-field home run, becoming the 115th player in major league history to hit a home run in his first at-bat. Rosario played in 122 games for the Twins, sharing outfield duties with Torii Hunter, Aaron Hicks, and fellow prospect Byron Buxton. Despite being called up a month into the season, Rosario led all of baseball in triples with 15, and was second in outfield assists with 16, just one behind Avisail García of the Chicago White Sox. Rosario finished his rookie campaign with a .267 batting average and 13 home runs.

With the retirement of Torii Hunter and the Twins' trade of Aaron Hicks, Rosario entered 2016 as the Twins' projected everyday left fielder. After a slow start and the emergence of both Robbie Grossman and Max Kepler, Rosario saw his playing time dwindle ultimately leading to his demotion to Triple-A. He was brought back up towards the end of the season, and finished the year with a .269 batting average, 10 home runs, and 32 RBI in 92 games played. In 2017, Rosario became the Twins’ everyday left fielder and emerged into one of the AL’s best hitters. On June 13 he had his first career 3 home run game going 4-5 and driving in 5 runs. Later in the season he won his first Player of the Week for the week of August 13, going .444/.484/1.000 with 4 home runs. He ranked in the top 25 for batting average, OPS, slugging, and doubles. In 151 games he batted .290 with 27 home runs and 78 RBI.

On April 18, 2018, before a sold-out crowd at the Hiram Bithorn Stadium in his homeland Puerto Rico, Rosario scored the winning run in the bottom of the 16th inning, coming around on Ryan LaMarre’s single that gave Minnesota a 2–1 win over the Cleveland Indians. Rosario hit three home runs in a game for the second time in his career on June 3 against the Cleveland Indians, going 3-5, driving in four runs, while hitting the game winning walk-off home run. He finished the season with the lowest fielding percentage among major league left fielders, at .967, and batted .288 with 24 home runs, 77 RBI, and a career high 161 hits in 138 games. Rosario was considered an All-Star "snub" in 2018. In 2019 he batted .276/.300/.500. He swung at the highest percentage of all pitches of all American League batters (59.1%). In 57 games in 2020, he batted .257 with 13 home runs and led the team with 42 RBI. On December 1, 2020, Rosario was placed on outright waivers and cleared waivers the next day. On December 2, Rosario was non-tendered by the Twins.

Cleveland Indians
On February 4, 2021, Rosario was signed to a one-year, $8 million contract with the Cleveland Indians. He played 78 games for the team, recording a .254 batting average and a .685 on-base plus slugging percentage. He was placed on the injured list on July 5.

Atlanta Braves
On July 30, 2021, Rosario was traded to the Atlanta Braves along with cash considerations in exchange for Pablo Sandoval. On September 19, Rosario hit for the cycle against the San Francisco Giants. In four at-bats, Rosario saw five pitches, the fewest pitches seen in a cycle since at least the 1990 season. 
In 2021, between both teams he batted .259/.305/.435 with 14 home runs and 62 RBIs.

On October 17, Rosario recorded four hits, including a walk-off single, in Game 2 of the National League Championship Series that gave the Braves a 5–4 win over the Los Angeles Dodgers. The 2021 Braves became the fourth team in Major League Baseball history to record two walk-off wins in the first two games of a postseason series, as Rosario matched the feat of teammate Austin Riley, who hit a walk-off single in Game 1. Rosario recorded two home runs and a triple as part of a second four-hit game in Game 4 of the series, following Steve Garvey as the only players to record those base hits in the postseason. Rosario was the fifth major league player to record two four-hit games during the playoffs, and the second to have both four-hit games occur in the same series. Teammate Adam Duvall followed Rosario's first home run of the game with a home run of his own, and they became the third pair of Braves teammates to hit consecutive home runs during a postseason game. In Game 6, Rosario had two hits, including a three-run home run as the Braves won 4–2 and clinched their first National League pennant since 1999. Rosario was awarded the NLCS MVP award for his performance in the series. 

On March 16, 2022, Rosario returned to the Braves on a two-year contract worth $18 million with a club option for the 2024 season. His season began with miserable play, accumulating just 3 hits for a batting average of .068 - a slump later revealed to be a result of issues in his right eye. Tests showed that Rosario's right retina was swollen, leading to blurred vision. A surgical procedure was scheduled for April 27, for which Rosario was projected to miss at least eight weeks. After making several rehab appearances in Triple-A Gwinnett and assembling a solid .273 batting average, he returned to the team on July 4.

International career
Rosario played for Puerto Rico in their silver medal run of the 2013 World Baseball Classic and their silver medal run of the 2017 World Baseball Classic. He played right field defensively and batted seventh in the lineup.

Personal life
Rosario and his wife, Milany, have three children. They reside in Kissimmee, Florida during the offseason.

See also
 List of Major League Baseball players from Puerto Rico
List of Major League Baseball players with a home run in their first major league at bat
List of Major League Baseball players to hit for the cycle

References

External links

1991 births
Living people
Atlanta Braves players
Baseball players suspended for drug offenses
Beloit Snappers players
Cleveland Indians players
Elizabethton Twins players
Fort Myers Miracle players
Glendale Desert Dogs players
Gulf Coast Twins players
Indios de Mayagüez players
Major League Baseball left fielders
Major League Baseball players from Puerto Rico
Minnesota Twins players
National League Championship Series MVPs
New Britain Rock Cats players
People from Guayama, Puerto Rico
Puerto Rican sportspeople in doping cases
Rochester Red Wings players
Salt River Rafters players
2013 World Baseball Classic players
2017 World Baseball Classic players
2023 World Baseball Classic players